{{Infobox officeholder
| name                = Kizhakkayil Mathai Chandy
| image               = File:Prof.K.M.Chandy.jpg
| caption             = Prof. K. M. Chandy
| imagesize           = 
| order               = 8th
| office              = Governor of Madhya Pradesh 
| term_start          = 30 December 1987
| term_end            = 30 March 1989
| 1blankname          = Chief Minister 
| 1namedata           = Motilal VoraArjun Singh
| predecessor         = Narayan Dutta Ojha 
| successor           = Sarla Grewal
| term_start1         = 15 May 1984
| term_end1           = 30 November 1987
| 1blankname1         = Chief Minister 
| 1namedata1          = Arjun SinghMotilal Vora
| predecessor1        = B. D. Sharma
| successor1          = Narayan Dutta Ojha 
| order2              = 6th
| office2             = Governor of Gujarat 
| term_start2         = 6 August 1983
| term_end2           = 26 April 1984
| 1blankname2         = Chief Minister 
| 1namedata2          = Madhav Singh Solanki
| predecessor2        = Sharda Mukherjee
| successor2          = Braj Kumar Nehru
| order3              = 7th
| office3             = Lieutenant Governor of Puducherry
| term_start3         = 15 May 1982
| term_end3           = 5 August 1983
| 1blankname3         = Chief Minister 
| 1namedata3          = M. D. R. Ramachandran
| predecessor3        = R.N. Haldipur
| successor3          = Kona Prabhakara Rao
| office4             = President of the Kerala Pradesh Congress Committee
| predecessor4        = K. C. Abraham
| successor4          = S. Varadarajan Nair
| term_start4         = January 1978 
| term_end4           = May 1982
| occupation          = 
| alma_mater          = St. Berchmans CollegeUniversity College Thiruvananthapuram
| residence           = Pala, Kerala
| spouse              = 
| children            = 10
| party               = Indian National Congress
| nickname            = 
| website             = 
| footnotes           = 
| date                = 11 July 2020
| source              = http://www.kmchandy.org/
| birth_name          = Kizhakkayil Mathai Chandy
| birth_date          = 
| birth_place         = Pala, Travancore, British India 

Kizhakkayil Mathai Chandy (6 August 1921 – 7 September 1998) was an Indian politician who served as the governor of the Indian states of Gujarat, Madhya Pradesh and the Union Territory of Pondicherry. He was also the former president of Kerala Pradesh Congress Committee (KPCC) and chairman of  Rubber Board.

He was elected unanimously to the State Legislature after Independence at the age of 26 and he was re-elected in 1952 and 1954. Chandy was mainly responsible for the establishment and growth of many big co-operative institutions in Kerala. The first ever Youth Congress Unit was started by him in the year 1953. He founded the Meenachil Co-operative Land Mortgage Bank. He was also the Founder of the Palai Co-operative Marketing Society. The Kerala State Rubber Marketing Federation was founded by him in 1971. He founded the Indian Rubber Growers Association in 1966. The present B. Tech. Course in rubber technology in the Cochin University is his brainchild. It was at his insistence that India joined the Association of Natural Rubber Producing Countries (ANRPC). He led a large number of delegations from India to conferences of International Rubber Study Group, Association of Natural Rubber Producing Countries (ANRPC), International Rubber Research Development Board held at London, Kuala Lumpur, Bangkok, Singapore, etc. from 1972 to 1978.

Early life 

K. M. Chandy was born on 6 August 1921 at Palai in Kottayam District as the son of Kizhakkayil Mathai and Mathai Mariyam. He had 3 younger brothers including  Pala K.M. Mathew (Former Member Of Parliament) and a sister. He had his schooling in his home town Palai and College education at Changanacherry and Trivandrum. He completed his M.A. in English Language and literature in 1942.

Personal life 
He was married to Mariakutty Chandy in the year 1939 at the age of 18. They have eight sons and two daughters.

Death 

Chandy died on 7 September 1998, aged 77, at Lisie Hospital, Ernakulam.

Biographies 

He couldn’t complete his autobiography titled "Jeevitha Vazhiyorakazhchakal" due to his sudden death, but later it was published by Labour (India) publications in 1999 after his death.
 
A biography on him titled "Varika Varika Sahajare" was written by Pala K.M. Mathew published by Current Books in 2009.

References

1921 births
1998 deaths
Governors of Gujarat
Governors of Madhya Pradesh
Lieutenant Governors of Puducherry